is the highest point on Rebun Island in Rebun,  Hokkaidō, Japan. The mountain consists of marine sedimentary rocks from the Early Cretaceous period, 149–97 million years ago.

Climbing route
The trailhead for the Mount Rebun hike is in Nairo. It is a 3-hour hike with no water available. The trail first passes through fields of sasa-no-ha before entering a forest of pine and birch. The peak rises above the forest to grant an unobstructed view of the entire island.

References

Rebun